The minimum wage in Romania is the lowest monthly or hourly remuneration that employers are legally allowed to pay their workers in Romania. The sum is decided by the Romanian government.

The current minimum wage in Romania since 1st January 2023 is 3.000 RON  which means 610 € gross for general workers and 4000 RON which means 812 € for construction workers.

Chart

History

See also
List of countries by minimum wage

References

Economy of Romania
Romania